"Miss the Girl" is the debut single recorded by English band the Creatures (Siouxsie Sioux and drummer Budgie). It was co-produced by Mike Hedges and was released as the lead single from the critically acclaimed Feast album. It was remastered in 1997 for A Bestiary Of.

The main instruments used were marimba and percussion, giving the song a distinctive and original sound.

The single peaked at No. 21 on the UK Singles Chart. "Miss the Girl" was the very first record released on Wonderland, a label created in 1983 by the members of Siouxsie and the Banshees.

Notes

1983 songs
1983 debut singles
The Creatures songs
Polydor Records singles
Songs written by Siouxsie Sioux
Songs written by Budgie (musician)
Song recordings produced by Mike Hedges
Music videos directed by Tim Pope